22nd CFCA Awards
December 21, 2009

Best Film:
 The Hurt Locker 

The 22nd Chicago Film Critics Association Awards, given by the CFCA on December 21, 2009, honored the best in film for 2009.

Winners and nominees

Best Actor
Jeremy Renner – The Hurt Locker
 Jeff Bridges – Crazy Heart
 George Clooney – Up in the Air
 Matt Damon – The Informant!
 Michael Stuhlbarg – A Serious Man

Best Actress
Carey Mulligan – An Education
 Abbie Cornish – Bright Star
 Maya Rudolph – Away We Go
 Gabourey Sidibe – Precious
 Meryl Streep – Julie & Julia

Best Animated Film
Up
 Coraline
 Fantastic Mr. Fox
 Ponyo
 The Princess and the Frog

Best Cinematography
The Hurt Locker – Barry Ackroyd Avatar – Mauro Fiore
 Bright Star – Greg Fraser
 Inglourious Basterds – Robert Richardson
 Where the Wild Things Are – Lance Acord

Best DirectorKathryn Bigelow – The Hurt Locker
 Joel Coen and Ethan Coen – A Serious Man
 Spike Jonze – Where the Wild Things Are
 Jason Reitman – Up in the Air
 Quentin Tarantino – Inglourious Basterds

Best Documentary Film
Anvil! The Story of Anvil
 Capitalism: A Love Story
 The Cove
 Food, Inc.
 Tyson

Best Film
The Hurt Locker
 Inglourious Basterds
 A Serious Man
 Up in the Air
 Where the Wild Things Are

Best Foreign Language Film
The White Ribbon, Germany Broken Embraces, Spain
 Red Cliff, China/Hong Kong
 Sin Nombre, Spain
 Summer Hours, France

Best Original ScoreUp – Michael Giacchino Avatar – James Horner
 Fantastic Mr. Fox – Alexandre Desplat
 The Informant! – Marvin Hamlisch
 Where the Wild Things Are – Carter Burwell & Karen Orzolek

Best Screenplay – AdaptedUp in the Air – Jason Reitman & Sheldon Turner An Education – Nick Hornby
 In the Loop – Jesse Armstrong, Simon Blackwell, Armando Iannucci & Tony Roche
 The Informant! – Scott Z. Burns
 Where the Wild Things Are – Spike Jonze & Dave Eggers

Best Screenplay – OriginalThe Hurt Locker – Mark Boal Away We Go – Dave Eggers & Vendela Vida
 Inglourious Basterds – Quentin Tarantino
 A Serious Man – Joel Coen and Ethan Coen
 Up – Bob Peterson

Best Supporting ActorChristoph Waltz – Inglourious Basterds
 Peter Capaldi – In the Loop
 Woody Harrelson – The Messenger
 Christian McKay – Me and Orson Welles
 Stanley Tucci – The Lovely Bones

Best Supporting Actress
Mo'Nique – Precious
 Vera Farmiga – Up in the Air
 Anna Kendrick – Up in the Air
 Julianne Moore – A Single Man
 Natalie Portman – Brothers

Most Promising Filmmaker
Neill Blomkamp – District 9
 Scott Cooper – Crazy Heart
 Cary Fukunaga – Sin Nombre
 Duncan Jones – Moon
 Marc Webb – (500) Days of Summer

Most Promising Performer
Carey Mulligan – An Education
 Sharlto Copley – District 9
 Christian McKay – Me and Orson Welles
 Max Records – Where the Wild Things Are
 Gabourey Sidibe – Precious

References
 https://web.archive.org/web/20100224070822/http://www.chicagofilmcritics.org/index.php?option=com_content&view=article&id=62&Itemid=60

 2009
2009 film awards